Polaris is a 2022 Canadian action film directed by Kirsten Carthew.  The film stars Viva Lee as Sumi, a young girl who is trying to reunite with her mother after being kidnapped by marauders, and is lost in a frozen wasteland where her only guide is a polar bear.

The film is thematically related to, but not a direct expansion of, Carthew's 2015 short film Fish Out of Water.

Cast
 Viva Lee as Sumi
  as Dee
 Khamisa Wilsher as Frozen Girl

Release
The film premiered at the Fantasia International Film Festival on 14 July 2022. It later screened in the Borsos Competition at the 2022 Whistler Film Festival.

Reception
Allan Hunter of Screen Daily wrote that "Muriel Dutil brings a scene-stealing warmth to the role of Dee, a scarred, hermit-like older woman who gives shelter to Sumi, whilst Viva Lee makes Sumi herself a fierce, intelligent central figure." Nick Allen of RogerEbert.com called it the "kind of film in which the ambition of the project can drive the curiosity of the narrative more than the plot." Kurt Halfyard of ScreenAnarchy wrote that "Carthew often eschews clean point A to point B storytelling in favour of the poetic. The film wants you to accept its mysteries, and the geography, of its harsh world without explanation. It wants to you feel the birth of mythology. It does so with more than a little grit."

Deirdre Crimmins of Rue Morgue wrote that "when taken for its visuals, incredible performances and world-building, POLARIS is a worthy entry in post-apocalyptic cinema’s hallowed halls. Frustratingly, the extra layers of forced fables get in the way of its ascending to greatness." Rachel Ho from Exclaim similarly praised the film, describing it as bold with an "obvious environmental message". The reviewer concluded that the "marriage between beautiful and violent visuals, captivating communication, and poignant themes is simply wonderful".

At Whistler, David Schuurman won the award for Best Cinematography in a Borsos Competition Film, and Lee received an honourable mention for Best Performance in a Borsos Competition film.

References

External links
 
 

Canadian action films
2022 action films
2022 films
Films shot in Yukon
2020s Canadian films
2020s English-language films
English-language Canadian films